Jaka Daneu (born February 3, 1971) is a Slovenian former professional basketball player.

Professional career
Daneu played for Smelt Olimpija, Czarni Słupsk and Geoplin Slovan.

Slovenian national team
Daneu was a member of the Slovenia national basketball team since 1992.  He competed at Eurobasket 1993, Eurobasket 1995, Eurobasket 1997 and Eurobasket 1999. He represented Slovenia officially at 67 games.  and scored a 362 points

Personal life
His father is basketball player Ivo Daneu.

References

External links 
 Eurobasket.com Profile 
 Fiba Profile 

1971 births
Living people
ABA League players
KK Olimpija players
Point guards
Slovenian men's basketball players
Basketball players from Ljubljana